Jennifer Ann Kirkman (born August 28, 1974) is an American stand-up comedian and screenwriter, podcaster, and actress. She is known for her regular appearances as a round-table panelist on Chelsea Lately for 70 episodes from 2008 to 2014.

Jen Kirkman was also a guest on @midnight, as well as for her appearances on the Funny or Die sketch series Drunk History, and its continuation television series on Comedy Central.

Her first three comedy albums released are Self Help (2006), Hail to the Freaks (2011) and I'm Gonna Die Alone (And I Feel Fine) (2016), the latter also serving as her debut stand-up feature for Netflix. Her second stand-up feature, Just Keep Livin'?, premiered in January 2017 and was released as an album in November 2018. Her debut book, I Can Barely Take Care of Myself: Tales From a Happy Life Without Kids, was published in April 2013, and became a New York Times  bestseller.

Early life
Kirkman was born in Needham, Massachusetts on August 28, 1974, and is the youngest of three sisters. She is of German, Polish, French-Canadian and English heritage.

Kirkman majored in acting at Emerson College in Boston.

Career

Stand-up comedy
Kirkman performs stand-up comedy in Los Angeles, California, appearing regularly at the Hollywood Improv, The Laugh Factory, Largo and The Upright Citizens Brigade Theatre. She has performed with comedians Maria Bamford, Greg Behrendt, Mike Birbiglia and Chelsea Handler. In 2009 and 2010, she performed as part of the Comedians of Chelsea Lately. In 2009, Entertainment Weekly named her one of the "Top 12 Rising Stars in Comedy," and in May 2010, both MSN and The Huffington Post named her one of the top comedians to follow on social networking service Twitter.

Kirkman produces No Fun, her own weekly podcast (previously titled I Seem Fun and Having Funlessness), and has made several appearances on The Crabfeast podcast, which is hosted by comedians Jay Larson and Ryan Sickler. She also appeared regularly on the monthly Pod F. Tompkast podcast with Paul F. Tompkins, on which he referred to her by the nickname 'Southie'.

In 2006, Kirkman released her debut comedy album, Self Help, through AST Records. Her second album, Hail to the Freaks, was recorded live at The Upright Citizens Brigade Theatre on December 11, 2010. It was released on May 17, 2011 with a bonus disk of additional material, and peaked at #13 on the Billboard Top Comedy Albums chart.

Television
Kirkman was a narrator on two episodes of the Funny or Die-produced series Drunk History on HBO, which received the jury prize for "Best Short Film" at the 2010 Sundance Film Festival. Though it is often questioned, she was actually drunk for both episodes. She has made guest appearances on several American television talk shows, including Conan, The View, and The Late Show with Stephen Colbert, and has performed on The Late Late Show with Craig Ferguson, Late Friday, Premium Blend, @midnight and Special Sauce. In 2007, she appeared as a cast member on the short-lived sketch comedy show Acceptable.TV on VH1. She has also made regular voice-over appearances on the Adult Swim series Home Movies and the political satire animated series SuperNews! on Current TV. In 2009, she wrote two episodes of the Disney Channel animated series Phineas and Ferb.

Most notably, Kirkman was a staff writer and round-table regular on E!'s Chelsea Lately. On June 3, 2010, she announced she would be leaving Chelsea Lately to join the writing staff for Perfect Couples, a romantic situation comedy which premiered as a mid-season replacement on NBC on January 20, 2011. She continued to make occasional round-table appearances on Chelsea Lately, beginning in late 2010. Perfect Couples was removed from the NBC schedule on March 11, 2011, and Kirkman returned to the writing staff of Chelsea Lately in April 2011. In 2011, she began making regular appearances on the second season of After Lately.

In November 2013, Deadline reported that FX had landed a script deal to Jen, a half-hour sitcom executive produced, written by and starring Kirkman. The series, set in Boston, Massachusetts, centered on a recently divorced a woman in her mid-30s. The project was backed by Borderline Amazing Productions, with executive producers Chelsea Handler, Tom Brunelle and Brad Wollack.

In May 2015, she released her stand-up feature on Netflix, I'm Gonna Die Alone (And I Feel Fine). Her second stand-up feature for Netflix, Just Keep Livin'?, premiered on January 3, 2017.

In 2017 and 2018, Kirkman contributed to the first two seasons of The Marvelous Mrs. Maisel as a writer, consultant, and producer, providing many of the jokes for the main character's stand-up routines. The series, created by Amy Sherman-Palladino for Amazon, is "loosely based on the concept of Joan Rivers' career."

On October 11, 2017, it was reported that ABC had started development on The Mighty Quinn, a television series written by Kirkman and produced by Julie Anne Robinson. The half-hour comedy series focuses on "39-year-old Quinn, who, after getting dumped by her boyfriend on Christmas Day, takes a year off from dating to find herself."

Comedy writing
Kirkman's first book, I Can Barely Take Care of Myself: Tales From a Happy Life Without Kids, was published in hardcover on April 16, 2013, and was listed on The New York Times Non-Fiction Best Seller list. In late 2013, she signed her second book deal with Simon & Schuster, a follow-up to her best-selling debut. Her second book, I Know What I'm Doing and Other Lies I Tell Myself: Dispatches from a Life Under Construction, was published in April 2016. She also has several published essays, which have been included in Rejected: Tales of the Failed, Dumped & Canceled and Bad Sex: We Did It So You Don't Have To.

In 2001, Kirkman founded Girlcomic.net with fellow comedian Becky Donohue. The website featured interviews with comedians such as Joy Behar, Margaret Cho, Sue Murphy, Amy Poehler and Sarah Silverman. On the intention of the website, Kirkman stated that the "one thing about feeling like there are still threads of sexism is women can get discouraged and we wanted [to encourage] girls to write funny stories and we wanted to interview famous female comics to let their stories get out. It was meant to be positive and cool and we included men on the site too." Regular updates to the website ceased in 2003, and the domain was ultimately closed in 2006.

In 2021, Kirkman joined The Marvelous Mrs. Maisel as a stand-up consultant for the jokes told by the character of Midge Maisel.

Influences
Kirkman has cited Joan Rivers, Howard Stern, Roseanne Barr, Dave Chappelle, Chris Rock and David Spade as having an influence on her sense of humor.

As an eight-year-old, she would sneak over to a friend's house to watch Sam Kinison and George Carlin comedy specials on HBO. "[Kinison] was a big thing for me," she said. "Someone is yelling, I'm not in trouble, and it's funny." She has cited Morrissey as perhaps her greatest influence, and although she is "nothing like him," his ability "to say morbid things with a sense of humor is now in my DNA."

Personal life 
On August 21, 2009, Kirkman married writer/director Neil Mahoney in a private ceremony at the Wayside Inn in Sudbury, Massachusetts. On the August 25, 2011 episode of Chelsea Lately, she revealed she was no longer married.

Filmography
Home Again (2017)
Just Keep Living? (2017)
I'm Gonna Die Alone (And I Feel Fine) (2015)
American Dirtbags (2015)
Every Other Summer (2015)
Have You Been Paying Attention? (2014)
@midnight (2014–2017)
Drunk History (2013–2015)
After Lately (2011–2013)
Perfect Couples (2011)
Conan (2011)
Drunk History (2010)
Chelsea Lately (2009–2014)
The Late Late Show with Craig Ferguson (2008)
Max 1,000 Words (2008)
The Very Funny Show (2007)
Acceptable.TV (2007)
SuperNews! (2006–2009)
Funny Money (2003)
Home Movies (2001–2002)
Late Friday (2001)

Discography
 Self Help (2006)
 Hail to the Freaks (2011)
 I'm Gonna Die Alone (And I Feel Fine) (2016)
 Just Keep Livin'? (2017)
 OK, Gen-X (2022)

References

External links
 Official website
 
 

21st-century American comedians
Actresses from Massachusetts
American conspiracy theorists
American people of English descent
American people of French-Canadian descent
American people of German descent
American people of Polish descent
American stand-up comedians
American television actresses
American television writers
American voice actresses
American women comedians
Living people
People from Needham, Massachusetts
Upright Citizens Brigade Theater performers
American women television writers
1974 births
Screenwriters from Massachusetts
Comedians from Massachusetts
21st-century American screenwriters
21st-century American actresses